The 1979 United Kingdom general election in Wales saw the Labour Party win the most votes and seats in Wales.

Background 
The Labour party won the most votes in Wales, although the Conservatives won most votes UK-wide.

John Morris, Baron Morris of Aberavon was under the impression that Prime Minister James Callaghan would call a general election in the autumn of 1978, but called it off. A Welsh devolution referendum was held in March 1979, two months prior. A Welsh Assembly was rejected, with regional distrust as a potential factor.

References 

1979 in Wales
1970s elections in Wales
General elections in Wales to the Parliament of the United Kingdom
1979 United Kingdom general election